Kirke may refer to:

Alexis Kirke, British composer and filmmaker
Álvur Kirke (born 1939), Faroese politician
Basil Wharton Kirke (1893–1958), Australian radio executive
David Kirke, English adventurer, colonizer and governor
George Kirke (died 1675), Scottish courtier 
Gord Kirke, Canadian sports and entertainment lawyer
Ian Kirke, English rugby league footballer
Jemima Kirke (born 1985), English-American artist, actress and director
Lola Kirke (born 1990), English-American actress and singer-songwriter
Percy Kirke (c. 1646–1691), English soldier, son of George Kirke
Simon Kirke (born 1949), English rock drummer and songwriter
Sir Walter Kirke (1877–1949), English general in WWII
Also
Circe or Kírkē, a goddess in Greek mythology
Kirke University, fictional setting of Campus (TV series)

See also
Kirk (disambiguation)